Juhan Mihkel Ainson (1 July 1873 – 1962), also known as Johan Mihkel Ainson, was an Estonian politician.

Born in the village of Holstre on 1 July 1873, Ainson was a doctor and practised as a veterinary scientist. He was a member of the Provincial Assembly which governed the Autonomous Governorate of Estonia between 1917 and 1919. After the Estonian War of Independence allowed Estonia to set up its own constitution, he sat on the Constituent Assembly which drafted it. He was a member from the start of the session on 23 April 1919 until he stepped down on 18 December 1919; Juhan Ostrat replaced him. Ainson sat in the Constituent Assembly as a member of the Estonian People's Party.

Ainson died in 1962 in West Germany.

References 

1873 births
1962 deaths
People from Viljandi Parish
People from Kreis Fellin
Estonian People's Party politicians
Members of the Estonian Provincial Assembly
Members of the Estonian Constituent Assembly
Estonian veterinarians
Academic staff of the University of Tartu
Estonian World War II refugees
Estonian emigrants to Germany